The 1997–98 NBA season was the ninth season for the Orlando Magic in the National Basketball Association. The Magic hired Chuck Daly as head coach, who led the Detroit Pistons to two straight championships in 1989 and 1990. In the off-season, the team acquired All-Star guard Mark Price from the Golden State Warriors, acquired Derek Harper from the Dallas Mavericks, and signed free agent Bo Outlaw. Under Daly, the Magic would get off to a solid 16–7 start. However, they struggled losing nine of their next ten games, as Penny Hardaway only played just 19 games due to a knee injury, averaging 16.4 points and 1.5 steals per game. The team then lost seven straight games in January, as Darrell Armstrong was out for the remainder of the season with a torn rotator cuff in his right shoulder after 48 games. The Magic also signed free agent Vernon Maxwell in January, but released him to free agency after eleven games, as he later on signed with the Charlotte Hornets.

At midseason, the team traded Rony Seikaly to the Utah Jazz in exchange for Greg Foster and Chris Morris. However, the trade was voided due to Seikaly failing to report to the team, because of a foot injury. Instead, he was then traded along with second-year forward Brian Evans to the New Jersey Nets in exchange for David Benoit, Kevin Edwards and Yinka Dare, who never played for the Magic and was released to free agency. After the trade, the Magic signed free agent and former Slam Dunk champion Spud Webb, who only played just four games for the team. The Magic held a 23–25 record at the All-Star break, and finished fifth in the Atlantic Division with a record of 41–41, missing the playoffs for the first time since the 1992–93 season.

In Hardaway's absence, Nick Anderson stepped up averaging 15.3 points and 5.1 rebounds per game, while Horace Grant averaged 12.1 points and 8.1 rebounds per game, and Derek Strong provided the team with 12.7 points, and 7.4 rebounds per game off the bench as the team's sixth man. In addition, Outlaw had a stellar season averaging 9.5 points, 7.8 rebounds, 1.3 steals and 2.2 blocks per game, while Price contributed 9.5 points and 4.7 assists per game, Armstrong provided with 9.2 points and 4.9 assists per game, and Harper contributed 8.6 points and 3.5 assists per game. Danny Schayes became the team's starting center after Seikaly was traded, as he averaged 5.5 points and 3.3 rebounds per game. Anderson also finished tied in fourth place in Most Improved Player voting, while Outlaw finished tied in eighth place.

Despite the knee injuries, Hardaway was selected for the 1998 NBA All-Star Game, which would be his final All-Star appearance. Following the season, Price retired after playing 12 seasons in the NBA, while Harper signed as a free agent with the Los Angeles Lakers, and Benoit and Edwards were both released to free agency.

Draft picks

Roster

Regular season

Season standings

z – clinched division title
y – clinched division title
x – clinched playoff spot

Record vs. opponents

Game log

Player statistics

Awards and honors
 Penny Hardaway – All-Star

Transactions

References

Orlando Magic seasons
1997 in sports in Florida
1998 in sports in Florida